This is a list of companies that formerly manufactured and / or sold tractors.  Some tractor and / or agricultural machinery companies have discontinued manufacturing, or were bought out or merged with other companies, or their company names may have changed.

A
Aaron David Co. (Denmark)
Abega (Germany)
Abenaque (USA)
Acam (Denmark)
Acason
Accord (Greece)
ACME (USA)
ACO (South Africa)
Acremaster (Australia)
Adams-Farnham (USA)
Adams Husker (USA)
Adams Sidehill (USA)
ADN (France)
Adriatica (Italy)
Advance (USA) – purchased by Rumely
Advance-Rumely (USA) – purchased by Allis-Chalmers
Aecherli (Switzerland)
AF France (France)
AGCO (USA) – discontinued
AGCO-Allis (USA) – renamed AGCO and discontinued; still built in Argentina
Agcostar (USA) – part of AGCO Corporation formed from McConnell
Agricultural & General Engineers (AGE) (England, UK)
Ager (Italy)
Agil (Austria)
Agra Farmer (Canada)
Agracat (USA) – imported
Agrale-Deutz (Brazil) – just Agrale now
Agria GmbH (Germany)
Agrifull (Italy) – purchased by Fiat
Agrimeca (Argentina)
Agrimotor (USA)
Agrip (France)
Agri-Power (USA)
AGRISA-Bungartz (Brazil) – became Agrale
Agritec (Argentina)
Agromed (Turkey)
Agromet (Poland)
A.H. McDonald & Co. (Australia)
Ahlborn
Aion (Australia)
Ajax (USA)
Aktivist (Germany)
Albaugh-Dover Square Turn (USA)
Albion-Cuthbertson – James A. Cuthbertson (Scotland, UK)
ALFA (Spain)
Alfa Romeo (Italy)
Allaeys
Alldays & Onions (England, UK)
Allgaier (Germany)
Alliance
Allis-Chalmers (USA) – purchased by AGCO Corporation
Allmand (USA)
Almacoa (France)
Allwork (USA)
Alpenland (Germany)
Alpina (Switzerland)
Alpina-Oekonom (Switzerland)
Alu-Trac
Amepic
American (USA)
American (American Tractor Corporation) (USA) – purchased by J.I. Case
American-Abell (Canada)
American Harvestor (USA)
American Steel (USA)
American Tractor (USA)
Amiot (France)
Amog (Italy)
Andrews (USA)
Andrews-Kinkade (USA)
Anfibio (Brazil)
Anglo-Thai New Holland (Thailand)
Ansaldo-Fossati (Italy)
Antigo (USA)
Anton Schlüter München (Germany)
Apache (Argentina) – now Apache-Solis
Appleton (USA)
Arator
Argo (Italy)
Armington, A.P. (USA)
Armstrong Siddeley (England, UK)
Arnold-Sandberg (USA)
ASHTZ (Russia)
Assembled
Asso
Astoa (Spain)
Aston Martin (England, UK)
Atlas (USA)
Aulendorf (Germany)
Aulson (USA)
Aultman (USA)
Aultman & Taylor (USA)
Austin (USA)
Austin (France / England, UK)
Austin-Leyland (Turkey) (BMC Sanayi)
Austrak (Australia)
Austro (Austria)
Austro-Pimus (Austria)
Auto Tractor (USA)
Automotive (USA)
Auto-Tiller (USA)
AutoTrac (Canada)
Avance (Sweden) – merged into Munktell
Aveling – Marshall (England, UK)
Aveling & Porter (England, UK)
Aveling-Barford (England, UK)
Avery (USA) – purchased by Minneapolis-Moline
Avia (Spain)
Astoa (Spain)
Agria (Spain)
Agrimont Group
Tractors.ae

B

B.F. Avery (USA)
Babcock & Wilcox (Spain)
Babiole (France)
Backus (USA)
Badley (USA)
Baikonur IMT (Kazakhstan)
Bailor (USA)
Baird (USA)
Bajaj Tempo (India) – divested off and renamed Force Motors
Baker, A.D. (USA)
Baldwin (Australia)
Balilla (Italy)
Balmar
Balram (India)
Bambi
Bambia
Bantam (USA)
Banting Machine Co.
Barford & Perkins (England, UK)
Bariole (France?)
Barreiros (Spain)
Baskent (Turkey) 
Bates (USA)
Bates Steel Mule (USA)
Bauche (France)
Bautz (Germany)
Bear (USA)
Bearcat (USA)
Beaver (USA)
Beeman (USA)
Belazerus (Belarus)
Bell, Robert (USA)
Belleville (USA)
Beltrail (USA)
Ben (Italy)
Benz-Sendling (Germany)
Berliot (France)
Bernardin (Argentina) 
Bertolini (Italy)
Besser (USA)
Best (USA) – purchased by Holt; became Caterpillar Inc.
Bethlehem (USA)
Bettinson (United Kingdom) – Ford conversions
Bi.Som.Trac (France)
Big Bud (USA)
Big Bull (USA)
Big Four (USA)
Big Lizzie (Australia)
Bima (France)
Birrell (USA)
Bischoff (Germany)
Bison (France)
BJR (Spain)
Blackstone & Co (England, UK)
Blanc-Plaiche (France?)
Blaw-Knox (England, UK)
Blumberg (USA)
BM Volvo (Sweden) – evolved into the current Valtra, part of AGCO Corporation
BMB (England, UK) (British Motor Boats)
BMC (England, UK) – from merger of Austin and Nuffield; later became Leyland, finally Marshall (Tractors)
Bobbette (USA)
Boenker (USA)
Bofors (Sweden)
Bohrer
Bolgar (Bulgaria)
Bolinder (Sweden) – merged with Munktell to become Bolinder-Munktell
Bolinder-Munktell (Sweden) – merged with Volvo to become BM Volvo / Volvo BM
Bolte (USA)
Bori (Slovenia)
Boring (USA)
Borsig (Germany)
BOS Hydro-Trac (Netherlands)
Boyett (USA)
Bradley (USA)
Brandt (France)
Brasitalia (Brazil)
Braud (France)
Braun (Germany)
Bray (England, UK)
Bready (USA)
Breda (Italy)
Breed (USA)
Bristol (England, UK)
British-Canadian (USA)
British Wallis (United Kingdom)
Brockway (USA)
Brons (Netherlands)
Brown (Australia)
Brown (USA)
Bruff – Ford conversions
Brummer
Bryan (USA)
BTG (Germany)
BTW
Bubba (Italy)
Bücher (Switzerland)
Buckeye (USA)
Buffalo
Buffalo-Pitts (USA)
BUKH (Denmark)
Bührer (Switzerland)
Bull (USA)
Bull Dog (USA)
Bulldawg
Bull-Madison (USA)
Bullock (USA)
Bulltra
Bungartz (Germany)
Bungartz & Peschke (Germany)
Bunton
Burn-Oil (USA)
Burrell (England, UK)
Busatto (Italy)
BWS

C
C. & G. Cooper (USA)
C.L. Best (USA)
C.O.D. (USA)
Caldwell (Australia) – became Caldwell Vale
Caldwell Vale (Australia)
Calmescri (Brazil)
Calsa (Spain)
Cameco (USA) – sold to John Deere
Cameron (USA)
Camisa
Campagnolo (Italy)
Canadian (Canada)
Canadian-American (Canada / USA)
CanTRAN
Canycom
Carter
Case Corporation (USA) – purchased by Tenneco, and later merged with International Harvester to become Case IH
Case New Holland (India)
Case, J.I (USA) – was purchased by Massey-Harris
Cassani (Italy)
CAST (Italy)
Caterpillar (USA) – sold tractor business to AGCO Corp.
Cayuga (USA)
CBT – Companhia Brasileira de Tratores (Brazil)
CDHL (USA)
Centaur (USA)
Centenario
Century (USA)
Ceres (France)
Ceres (India) – brand of International Tractors (Sonalika)
Certified (USA)
Chamberlain (Australia) – purchased by Deere & Company
Champ (Thailand)
Champion (USA)
Champion (France)
Chase (USA, 1908–1918; Canada, 1919-1921)
Chaseside (England, UK)
Chery (China) – became Detank, now Zoomlion
Cherry (Japan)
CIDEF (Argentina)
CIMAC (Italy)
Citroen (France)
Claeys (Belgium)
Clarktor
Clayson (England, UK)
Clayton & Shuttleworth (England, UK)
Cleveland Tractor Company/Cletrac (USA) – purchased by the Oliver Corporation in 1944
CMC (Argentina)
CNC (France)
Cobey (USA)
Cockshutt Plow Company (Canada) – purchased by White Farm Equipment
Cockshutt Hart-Parr (Canada)
Codem (The Netherlands)
Coleman (USA)
Colpron (Canada) – rebadged Landini's
Colt (USA)
Common Sense (USA)
COMPACT Junior (Austria)
Conord
Consolidated (USA)
Continental (USA)
Co-op (USA)
Co-op (National Farm Machinery) (USA)
Co-op Implements (Canada)
Cooper
Corbitt (USA)
Corliss (USA)
County (England, UK)
Crawley Agrimotor (England, UK)
Crystal Zetor (Czech)
Csepel (Hungary)
CTM
Cultivac
Cultor (USA)
Custom (USA)
Cutherbertson – James A. Cuthbertson (Scotland, UK)

D
Daimler (Germany)
Daimler-Benz (Germany)
Dammann (USA)
Danhorse (Denmark)
Davey Paxman & Co. (England, UK)
David Bradley (plowman) (USA)
David Brown Ltd. (England, UK) – purchased by Tenneco and renamed Case
DECA (Argentina)
Deering (USA) – merged with other manufacturers to form International Harvester
Defaut (France)
Dongfeng (China) – DFAM
Detank (China) – now Zoomlion
Detroit (USA)
Deuliewag (Germany)
Deutz (Germany) – merged with Fahr
Deutz-Allis (Germany / USA) – formed when Deutz-Fahr bought Allis-Chalmers; purchased by AGCO and became AGCO-Allis
Dexheimer (Germany)
DF (China)
Diana (Greece)
DongFangHong (China) – now YTO
Doppstadt (Germany)
Dragon (USA)
Drexler (Austria)
Dromson (Germany)
Dufuat
Durany (Argentina)
DUTRA (Hungary)
DUTRA Steyr (Hungary)

E

Eagle (USA)
Ebro (Spain)
Ebro-Kubota (Spain)
Eclipse (USA)
Edwin Alber
Eicher (Germany)
Eicher Goodearth (India) – became just Eicher
Ekip (Turkey) – became Fatih Traktor
El Chiquito (Argentina)
EMCO (USA) – later Power Horse
Emerson (Canada)
Emerson-Brantingham (USA)
Empire (USA)
Enter (Turkey)
Enti (The Netherlands)
Epple-Buxbaum (Austria)
Erickson (USA)
Escanuela (Argentina)
Euro-Trac (India)

F
Fageol (USA)
Fahr (Germany) – merged with Deutz to become Deutz-Fahr
Falke-trac (Germany)
Farm Ette (USA)
Farm System
Farmall (USA) – by International Harvester
Farmár (Czech)
Farmaster (USA)
Farmcrest (USA)
Farmer's Union Co-op (USA)
FarmHandy (USA)
Farmliner Daedong (Australia) – built in South Korea
Farmobile (USA)
Farmwell (England, UK)
Farquhar, A. B. (USA) – merged into the Oliver Corporation
Fatsia (England, UK) – formerly B.Welsh agri
Favias (Spain)
FBW (Switzerland)
FengShou (China) – now Jiangling, part of Mahindra
Ferguson (Ireland)
Ferguson-Brown (England, UK)
Fiat OM
Fiat Someca (France)
Fiat-Agrifull (Italy)
Fiat-Goldstar (South Korea) – now LS-New Holland
Field Marshall (England, UK) – became Marshall
Finn Ursus
FNM (Brazil)
Foden (England, UK)
Ford SAF
Ford (USA) –  Ford tractor division bought Sperry-New Holland and became Ford-New Holland, now New Holland, part of CNH Industrial
Ford-Ferguson (USA)
Fordson tractor (USA / England, UK) – by Ford
Fordzon-Putilovec (Russia)
Forma (Romania)
Fortschritt (East Germany)
Foton (China) – now Lovol
Four Drive (USA) – also known as Fitch Four Drive
Four Wheel Traction (England, UK)
Fowler (England, UK)
Frick (USA)
Froehlich (USA) – purchased by Deere & Company
Fundinoza (Argentina)
Fujian (China)
Futian (China) – changed to Foton, now Lovol
Futian Leopard (China) – now Foton or Foton Leopard
Futian Oubao (China) – changed to Foton, now Lovol
Fuyang Tractor (China)
Benniu 
FWD Wagner (USA)

G
Galloway (USA)
Gambles Farmcrest (USA)
Gardner (England or Belgium)
Garner (England, UK)
Garrett (USA)
Garrett (England, UK) – steam tractors and showmen's engines
Gaar-Scott (USA)
GBT (USA)
GEDA (Romania) 
GeDe (The Netherlands)
Geiser (USA)
General (USA)
General (England, UK)
George (USA)
Giaguaro (Italy)
Gibbons & Robinson
Gibson Mfg. (USA)
Gilson (Canada)
Glasgow (England, UK)
Global (USA)
GMW (Sweden)
GoldStar (South Korea) – later LG; now LS
Graham-Bradley (USA)
Gray Tractor Manufacturing Co. (USA)
Greaves (India) – later SAME Greaves
Greyhound (USA)
Griffin (USA)
Grissly
Grossi (Argentina) – now T&M Grossi
Grossi Migra (Argentina) – now T&M Grossi
Gualdi (Italy)
Güldner (Germany) – later part of Linde
Gulliver (Italy) – now SEP
Guthelfer (Spain)

H

Haas (USA)
Hahn-Eclipse (USA)
Hanomag (Germany)
Hanomag-Barreiros (Spain)
Hanzi (China)
Happy Farmer (USA)
Harrison Machine Works (Belleville, Illinois, USA)
Hart-Parr (USA) – merged into the Oliver Farm Equipment Company in 1929; purchased by Oliver Corporation
Hattat Agricultural Engines (Turkey)
Hatz (Germany)
Hefty (USA)
Heider (USA)
HELA (Germany)
HEMOS
Herriau
Hesston (USA) – tractors were part of Fiat; hay equipment and name purchased by AGCO
Highlander (England, UK) – specialist forestry conversions
Hindustan (India) – now MGTL
Hinomoto (Japan) – acquired by Hitachi and renamed Tierra
Hitachi (Japan)
Hittner (Croatia)
HMT (India)
Hofherr HSCS (Germany)
Hofherr-Schrantz (Hungary)
Holder GmbH (Germany)
Holt Manufacturing Company (USA) – merged with Best to form the Caterpillar Tractor Company
Homesteader (USA) – Clinton, AR – garden tractors
Homier Farm-Pro (USA)
Honda (Japan) 
Richard Hornsby & Sons (England, UK)
Horwood Bagshaw (Australia)
Howard (Australia) – tractor, rotavators and rotary tillers
Howard Farmers (England, UK)
HOYO (Romania) – assemble Tai Shan 
HSCS (Hungary)
Huber (USA)
Hume (USA)
Hydratiller (USA)
Hyundai (South Korea)

I
IAR (Romania)
IFA (Germany)
Illinois (USA)
IMA (Argentina)
Imor (Brazil)
Imperial Machine Co. – established 1902 (Minnesota, USA)
Imperial (Australia)
Imperial Super Drive (Canada)
Industrija Motora Rakovica (IMR) (Serbia) 
Intercontinental (USA)
International Harvester (Australia)
International Harvester (USA) – agriculture division sold to Tenneco and merged with Case to form Case IH in 1985
International TOE (Turkey) –  licensed IH
Is Bora (Turkey) – Shibauara
Ishikawajima-Harima (Japan) – now Shibaura
Isoto (Turkey) – license Tuber 
ITC (USA)
Ivel (England, UK) – invented by Dan Albone

J
J & H Howard
Jackson (USA)
JDS (Germany) 
Eicher
Valtra Eicher
Jeep (USA)
Jela
Jelbart (Australia)
Jiangling (China)
John Blue (USA)
John Deere Hattat (Turkey)
John Deere Lanz (Germany) – formerly Heinrich Lanz AG, originally Heinrich Lanz Company
Johnston (Sweden / France)
Juling (China) 
Jumbo (USA)
June (Sweden)
JWD (United Kingdom)

K
Kaelble (Germany)
Karl Blank (Germany)
KBZ (Russia) 
Keck-Gonnerman
Kelkel (Germany)
Kelly & Lewis (Australia)
Kelpie (England, UK)
Kemna
KHD (Austria)
Kínai
Kirloskar (India)
Kirov Plant (Russia)
Kirschmann (USA)
Kitten (USA)
Kiva (France)
Knudson (USA)
Kodiak (USA)
Kögel (Germany)
Kolomenec (Russia)
Komatsu (Japan)
Komatsu International (Japan)
Kommunar (USSR)
Komnick (Germany)
Koni
Köpfli (Switzerland)
Koyker
Kramer (Germany) – merged with Neuson, who then merged with Wacker AG
KTMCO (Iran / Kurdistan) – subsidiary of ITMCO
Krasser (Austria)
Kuhnhausen (Germany)
Kullervo (Finland)
Kullmo (Sweden)
Kulmus (Germany)
Kumiai (Japan)
Kunow (USA)

L
L&T – John Deere (India) – joint venture, bought out by Deere & Company
Labourier (France)
Lamborghini (Italy) — tractors were the original product of the current Lamborghini supercar company
Landhope (Japan) – by Iseki
Landleader (Japan) – by Iseki
LandTrac (USA) – by Long
LANZ (Germany) – original brand name of Heinrich Lanz AG, bought out in 1956 by John Deere owner Deere & Company
Latil (France)
Lauer (Germany?)
Lauson (USA)
Le Percheron (France)
Le Pratique (France)
Le Robuste (France)
Legras (France)
Lehr's Big Boy (USA)
Lely Multipower (USA)
Lely (The Netherlands)
Lenar
Leo Rumely (USA)
LeRoi (USA)
LESA (Italy)
LeTourneau (USA)
Leyland (England, UK) – later Marshall
LG (South Korea) – now LS
LG-Fiat (South Korea) – now LS-New Holland
LG Montana (USA) – now Montana
LG-New Holland (South Korea) – now LS-New Holland
LHB (Germany)
Liaz (Czech)
Liberty (USA)
Lightforce Deluxe
Lightforce Tractore
Linn maker of the Linn tractor – Republic Motor Truck Company (USA)
Lioness (England, UK)
Lister (England, UK)
Li-Trac (Germany)
Little Giant (USA)
Loiseau (France)
Loko-Mobil
Long (USA)
LongAgri (USA)
LTS (Germany)
Luoyang Fiat (China)
LUX-TRAC (Luxembourg)
Luzhong (China)

M
M.R.S. (USA)
MacLaren
Macrosa (Argentina)
Madson (USA)
Mahindra & Manhindra (India)
Malkotsis (Greece)
Malcus (Sweden)
Malves (Brazil)
Malyshev Factory (USSR)
MAN (Germany)
Mancini (Argentina)
Mann's Patent Steam Cart and Wagon Company (England, UK)
MAP (France)
Marshall, Sons & Co. (England, UK) – builders of Field Marshall brand
Marshall Tractors (England, UK) – formerly Leyland tractors
Martin (Germany)
Martin Diesel (Slovak)
Massey-Harris (Canada)
Massey-Harris-Ferguson (Canada)
Matbro (England, UK)
Mathis-Moline (France)
Maverick (USA)
Maxion (Brazil) – backhoes still built using name
Maxitrac
McConnell (Canada) – sold to AGCO Corporation, later AgcoStar
McCormick (USA) – merged with others to form International Harvester
McCormick-Deering (USA) – by International Harvester
McCormick TOE (Turkey) – licensed IH
McDonald (Australia)
McKee Ebro (Canada)
McLaren (England, UK) – see J&H McLaren & Co.
MDW-Fortschritt (East Germany)
Mecavia (France)
Medved (Russia)
MeMo (USA)
E. Meili Traktorenfabrik (Switzerland)
Mercer (USA)
Metis (Slovak)
MIAG (Germany)
Millennium (USA)
Minneapolis (USA) – merged with Moline Plow to form Minneapolis-Moline
Minneapolis-Moline (USA) – purchased by White Farm Equipment
Minneapolis-Moline Türk Traktör (Turkey)
Minnesota (USA)
Moffett (Ireland)
Mogul (USA)
Moline Plow Company (USA) – merged with Minneapolis to form Minneapolis-Moline
Monarch (USA) – purchased by Allis-Chalmers
Montana (USA)
Montana LS (Brazil)
Montana Solis (Brazil)
Morris-Leyland (Turkey)
Motocultores Pasquali (Spain)
Motoyuyera (Argentina)
Motrac Werke AG. 1937–1969 (Switzerland)
Motransa (Spain)
Mountain State (USA)
Mt. Super (Slovakia)
MTW (Germany) –  Ritscher
Muir-Hill (England, UK)
Müller (Brazil)
Munktell (Sweden) – merged with Bolinder to form Bolinder-Munktell
MVM (Russia)
MWM (Motoren Werke Mannheim AG) (Germany)
Myth-Holm (England, UK) – formerly Muir-Hill

N
Nallahay
NanYue (China)
Naughton (Australia)
Nedalo (Netherlands) – Ford conversions
Nelson (USA)
New Holland Agriculture (USA)
New Holland Tractors (India)
Newman (England, UK)
Nibbi (Italy)
Nichols & Shepherd (USA) – merged to form Oliver Farm Equipment Company in 1929
Nordtrak (Germany)
Normag (Germany)
North Land (USA)
Northrop (England, UK)
Northwest (USA)
Nuffield (England, UK) – later Leyland, and then Marshall Tractors
Nuffield Morris (Turkey)

O

O&K / Orenstein and Koppel (Germany)
Oliver (USA)
Oliver Farm Equipment Company (USA)
Oliver Corporation (USA) – purchased by White Farm Equipment
Oliver Cletrac (USA)
Oliver Hart-Parr (USA)
OM (France)
OMP (Italy)
One Man Motor Plow (Canada)
Orsi (Italy)
Oak Tree Appliances (OTA) (England, UK)
OTO (Odero Terni Orlando) (Italy)
Ottawa (USA)
OUTZ

P
PAL (USA)
Panda
Panther (India)
Panzer (USA)
Paramount (USA)
Parca
Parrett (USA)
Pasco (Brazil)
Pavesi (Italy)
Pavesi-Tolotti (Italy)
Peerless (USA)
Perkis (Turkey) – based on Ursus
Perl (Austria)
Petropoulos (Greece)
PGS (Italy)
Phillips (Australia)
Phoenix (Australia)
Pillman (South Africa)
Pioneer (China)
Planet, Jr (USA)
Platten (Germany)
Plymouth (USA) – became Silver King
PMA (Algeria) – now Cirta
Pöhl (Germany)
Pollack (Argentina)
Polytrac (Switzerland)
Porsche (Germany)
Port Huron (USA)
Power Track
Power-Horse (USA)
Power King (USA)
President (England, UK) – designed by BMB (British Motor Boats)
Price (USA)
Primul (USSR)
Primus (Germany)
Profintern (USSR)
PTZ (Kazhakistan)
Punjab (India)

Q
Quaker Mule (USA)
Quattrino
Quincy (USA)

R
RÁBA (Hungary)
RÁBA-Steiger
Randi (Italy)
Ransomes, Sims & Jefferies (England, UK)
Rapid (Spain)
RATAR (Yugoslavia)
Rayes (USA)
Raygo Wagner (USA)
Record (Greece)
Red Star
Reeves (USA)
Rein Drive (Canada)
Remington (USA)
Renault Agri (France) – purchased by Claas in 2003
Renault Sonalika International (RSI) – (Mauritius / India)
Rhino International (USA)
Rice (USA)
Richard Continental (France)
Richter (Australia)
RIMAS (Denmark) – Ford conversions
RIP (France)
Rite (USA)
Ritscher (Germany)
Roadless (England, UK)
Robey (England, UK) – steam tractors
Rock Island (USA) – purchased Heider, was then purchased by Case
Rockol (USA)
Rogers (USA)
Rogowski (Brazil)
Rohff (France)
Röhr (Germany)
ROLA (Sweden)
Rollo (Denmark)
Rombel (Romania)
Rome (USA)
Ronaldson Tippett (Australia)
Roux
Rotania (Argentina)
Roths Industries (USA)
Royal (Germany)
Rubine (Italy)
Rumely (USA)
Ruris (Romania)
Ruston (England, UK)
Ruslan (Argentina)
Russell & Company (Steam Tractor) - American(USA)
Ruston & Hornsby (England, UK)
Ruston, Proctor and Company (England, UK) – steam tractors
RYCSA (Argentina)

S
S.A.M.A. Renault (Spain)
S.W.Wood (USA)
Sabatier (France)
SAME (Italy) – taken over by Deutz-Fahr
SAME Greaves (India) – a joint venture, wholly purchased by Same Deutz-Fahr
Samson (USA)
Sandusky (USA)
Santa Matilde (Brazil)
Satoh (Japan) – merged with Mitsubishi
Saukville (USA)
Saunderson (England, UK)
SAVA-Nuffield (Spain)
Savatrac (Iran)
Scemia (France)
Schilter (Switzerland)
Schindler (Germany)
Schluter (Germany)
Schneider
Schramm (USA)
Scott (USA)
Scientific Farming Machinery Company (USA)
Selene (Italy)
Sepa (Italy)
Shakti (India)
Shaw (USA)
Shire
Siaco (Italy)
SIFT (France)
Silvatec (Denmark)
Silver King (USA)
SIMAR-Bodenfräse (Switzerland)
Simpac Trak (Italy)
Simpson Jumbo (USA)
Sirio (Italy)
Škoda (Czech)
SLC – John Deere (Brazil) – a joint venture, wholly purchased by Deere & Company
SM
Smallholder (England, UK)
Société Française de Vierzon (France) – purchased by Case
Solis Brasil (Brazil) – now just Solis
Someca (France) – purchased by Fiat
Sonalika International (India)
Speedy
Squire (Australia)
Steiger (USA) – purchased by Case
Steinbock (Austria)
Sterling (Canada)
Steyr-Nigeria (Nigeria)
Store (Yugoslavia)
Stotz (Belgium)
Strong
Sultan (Turkey)
Sunshine (Australia)
Sunshine (Kubota) (Japan)
Sunshine Massey Harris (Scotland, UK / Australia)
Superson
Sutcliff
Svedala (Sweden)
Svoboda (Czech)
Swed-Trac (Sweden)
Standard (India)

T
TAISSA (Spain)
Takra (Finland)
TAS (USA / Germany) – also sold as MeMo
Tasker
Taylor (USA)
Terra Power
Terratrac (USA) – crawler tractors built by American Tractor Company; purchased by J.I. Case
TESA (Spain)
Thieman (USA)
 (USA) – renamed 
Thorobred (USA)
TianTuo (China)
Tidaholms (Sweden)
Tiger (USA)
Tiger (China)
Tiger (Ranger) (Japan)
TigerTrac (USA)
Tirador (Argentina)
Titan (USA)
Titan (Steiger) (USA)
Titano (Italy)
Titus (Germany)
TMO (Brazil)
Tobatta (Brazil)
Toft (Australia)
Tolpar (Russia)
Tom Moore (USA)
Toma Vinković (Croatia) – now TTB
Toos (Iran) 
Torpedo (Croatia)
Torpedo Deutz (Croatia)
Tortone (Argentina)
TracZa (Argentina)
Track Marshall (England, UK)
trac-technik (Germany)
Tractocoop (France)
Tractomade (Argentina) – licensed by Pauny 
TMZ Zanello (Argentina)
Zanello (Tractomade)
Tractor Supply Co. (USA)
Tractormobile (USA)
Tratoretto (Brazil)
Tractors and Farm Equipment limited [TAFE] (India)
Tractorul UTB (Romania) – in receivership in 2007 
Titan
Universal UTB
Triunfo (Argentina)
Trojan (USA)
Trusty (England, UK)
TTB (Croatia) – now Prima and Hittner
TUR (Poland)
Turf Boss
TurkFiat (Turkey) – now New Holland
Turner (England, UK)
Twin City tractors (USA) – merged to become Minneapolis-Moline
Twister (USA)

U
U.T.B. (Romania) – now Universal UTB
Uncle Sam (USA)
Unigraf Lupo (Argentina)
United (USA)
UniTrak (Germany)
Universal (USA) – built in Ohio
UPD
Upton (Australia)
Ursus Hellas (Greece)
Ursus Italtractor (Italy)
Urtrak (Germany)
Utos (Romania)
Uzel (Turkey)

V
Valmet (Finland) – now Valtra
Valor (France)
Valtra Valmet (Finland) – now Valtra
Valtrac (France)
Vandezande (Belgium)
Vanguard (USA)
Variotrac (France)
Vassalli (Argentina)
Vellino (Spain)
Vendeuvre (France) – purchased by Allis-Chalmers
Verion (Argentina)
Versatile (Canada) – purchased by Ford, now owned by RostSelMash
Vevey tractors (Switzerland)
VeWeMa (Germany)
Vick (Brazil)
Victor (Japan)
Vierzon (France) – purchased by Case
Vittorio Cantatore (Italy)
Vladimir Factory (Russia)
Volgograd Tractor Factory (Russia)
Volvo (Sweden) – merged with Bolinder Munktells, now Valtra
Volvo BM (Sweden) – now Volvo Construction Equipment
Volvo BM Valmet (Harvesters) (Sweden) – now Valtra

W
WACO (Austria)
Wagner (USA)
Wallis (USA) – purchased by Massey-Harris
Wallis & Stevens (USA)
 (England, UK) – steam tractor (note odd spelling of name)
Waltanna (Australia)
Walter Barrett (USA)
Wards (USA)
Warrior (Italy)
Waterloo Boy (USA) – purchased by John Deere owner Deere & Company
Waterloo (Canada)
Weber (USA)
Webfoot (USA)
Welte
Werner (Germany)
Wesseler (Germany)
Western (USA)
Wheel Ox (USA)
White (USA) – purchased by AGCO Corporation
White Oliver (USA)
Whiting-Bull (USA)
Wikov (Czech / USA) – certain products now manufactured by Wisconsin Engineering
WildCat (USA)
Williames (Australia)
Winget (Australia)
Winget (United Kingdom) – noted for site dumpers and plant (was part of Babcock & Wilcox for a time)
Wisconsin (USA)
Wm Allchin (England, UK)
Wood Brothers (USA)
Woods & Copeland (USA) – purchased by Rome
Woody
Worthington Mower Company (USA)
Wright (South Africa)

X
Xiamen Xiagong Group (China) 
Sahm
Xiagong
Xinhu (China)

Y
Yankee (USA)
Yewers (Australia)

Z
Zadrugar (Yugoslavia)
Zanello (Argentina)
Zanello (Maquinarias) (Argentina) – now Zanello (CMZ)
Zanello (Pauny) (Argentina) – now Pauny Rino
Zaporozhec (Ukraine)
Zebra (USA)
Zetor (Czech) – with Zetor Crystal built in Poland by Ursus
ZTS (Slovak)

See also

List of current tractor manufacturers
List of traction engine and steam tractor manufacturers
List of tractors built by other companies
Agricultural engineering
List of agricultural machinery
Mechanised agriculture

References

External links

TractorData.com — list of tractor models by manufacturer

Lists of defunct companies
Defunct manufacturing companies